Taking Over is Jamaican reggae artist Sizzla's 11th studio album, released on June 19, 2001 on VP Records. It peaked at #7 on the Billboard reggae album charts.

Track listing
"Thought for Today" (Collins, Dennis) - 3:50
"Brand New" (Collins, Dennis) - 4:02
"Somewhere Oh Oh" (Collins, Dennis) - 4:13
"Taking Over" (Collins, Dennis) - 4:04
"Fare" (Collins, Dennis, Dunbar) - 3:56
"Higher Heights" (Dennis, Dunbar) - 3:58
"To the Point" (Collins, Edmund, James) - 3:33
"Reach" (Collins, Dennis) - 3:39
"Whirlwind" (Collins) - 4:57
"Profile" (Collins) - 4:17
"Kebra Negas" (Collins) - 4:21
"New Shield Corruption" (Collins, Dennis) - 3:45
"King Taco" (Collins, Dennis) - 4:21
"Hold Her in My Arms" (Collins, Dennis) - 4:00
"Streetside Knowledge" (Collins, Dennis) - 4:07

Credits
 Sizzla - vocals
 Black Pearl - engineer
 Philip Burrell - producer, executive producer
 Leroy Champaign - design
 Christopher Chin - executive producer
 Paul Daley - engineer
 Christopher James - producer, engineer
 John James - engineer
 Robert Murphy - engineer
 Sherida - Backing vocalist
 Steven Stanley - engineer
 Collin "Bulbie" York - engineer

References

External links
 [ Review] at Allmusic
 Sizzla website
 VP Records website

2001 albums
Sizzla albums